The 5th Pennsylvania Regiment, first known as the 4th Pennsylvania Battalion, was raised December 9, 1775, at Chester, Pennsylvania, for service with the Continental Army. The regiment would see action at Brandywine, Paoli, Germantown, Monmouth, Springfield, Green Spring, and Yorktown. The regiment was disbanded on January 1, 1783.

The regiment was known for wearing blue uniforms with white facings along with a leather jockey cap or light infantryman's cap if available. Scarlet trousers were very popular for unknown reasons exclusively to the 5th.

References

External links
Bibliography of the Continental Army in Pennsylvania compiled by the United States Army Center of Military History

Pennsylvania regiments of the Continental Army
Military units and formations established in 1775
Military units and formations disestablished in 1783